University School of Management Studies (commonly known as USMS) is a graduate ON-CAMPUS business school of Guru Gobind Singh Indraprastha University in New Delhi, India. The school offers a full-time MBA program, doctoral programs, as well as many other management programmes. It is currently the only on campus Business School under Guru Gobind Singh Indraprastha University. The School is rated A+ in Best B-Schools Survey, 2006 conducted by Business India.

History
In 1999, University School of Management Studies (USMS) was founded as one of the several University Schools of Studies under the Guru Gobind Singh Indraprastha University. The School was previously located at the Kashmiri Gate Campus of the university. It has now been shifted to the new West Campus of Guru Gobind Singh Indraprastha University at Dwarka, New Delhi.

Programs

The University School of Management Studies offers the following specialized streams:

MBA Program (Master of Business Administration)

University School of Management Studies offers a two-year full-time MBA program, which consists of one year of mandatory courses (Required Curriculum) and one year of unrestricted course selection (Elective Curriculum) in which the students can opt for 2 out of 5 specializations (One Major and the other as Minor). Admission to the course is on the basis of Common Entrance Test.
The various specializations on offer include:- Finance, Marketing, Human Resource Management, Systems & I.T., and International Business.

MBA Financial Analysis Program (Master of Business Administration in Financial Analysis)

USMS has launched MBA(Financial Analysis) Programme from the Academic Year 2019–20. The technological advances of the last decades have enabled the transformation of ‘data‘ into ‘information’ for better decision-making. This new programme aims to apply advanced analytical methods to financial problems by integrating core Management knowledge with statistical and quantitative analysis, predictive modelling and optimization to create significant business advantages for the corporate.

Doctoral Program (Ph.D.)
USMS also provides facility for pursuing doctoral research leading to the award of PhD degree. USMS aims at developing individuals into distinguished researchers, consultants, managers, and teachers in the field of management.

The School focuses on promoting inter-disciplinary research. The school, at present, has 88 registered Research scholars. Eleven students have been awarded Ph.D. degrees till date.

Thrust areas of research include the following: Global Business Management, HR Issues in an Organization, Healthcare Management, IT- Business Interface, Banking & Insurance, Brand & Retail Management, Entrepreneurship & Innovation.

B.Tech. - MBA Dual Degree
The school has also innovated a B.Tech. – M.B.A. (Dual Degree) Programme.

MBA Weekend

This Programme is aimed at catering to the continuing educational needs of the working / employed professional in the government, public and private sector who want to assume higher responsibilities to better serve the industry and the society by upgrading their qualification without leaving their jobs.

MBA (General) Weekend postgraduate programme

With various specializations, namely, -Finance, Marketing, human Resource Management, systems T I.T. and Global Business Management.
The MBA course is exclusively designed for working professional.

MBA (Real Estate) – Weekend

This programme in Real Estate is being conducted in active collaboration and association with school of Planning an Architecture (SPA). It is the first programme of its kind to be offered by any University in the country to educate students in the full range of skills demanded of today by the real estate industry. The curriculum integrates knowledge from each of the major disciplines (management, engineering, economics, planning and architecture, urban studies).

MBA (Banking and Insurance) – Weekend

This programme focuses on the financial sector and offers specialization in the area of banking or insurance in the second year. Banking and insurance are important segments of financial sector and play vital role in the development of national economic and international trade. Insurance sector has been opened up for private participation and in the times to come and will require a large number of qualified and trained manpower to cater to this huge market.

MBA (Consultancy Management) – Weekend
The programme was introduced last year to cater to the growing needs of consultancy services with the valuable support from CDC, Ministry of Science and technology.

Certificate Course in Behavior Testing and Training
The University School of Management Studies also has behavior testing and training laboratory it extends its services for psychometric testing to the industrial Houses for recruitment, selection, placement, promotion, transfers and employee profiling in general. This includes training on behavioral modification, attitude formation, leadership, team building even therapeutic training for clinical, pathological problems in employees.

Certificate Course in Retail
The University School of Management Studies recently launched a three-month Certificate Course in retail. The course is aimed to meet the demand for trained manpower in the retail industry in India. Candidates who have enrolled for the certificate course in retail will be trained in the basics of store operations and practical retail selling skills.

Campus

The University School of Management Studies is one of the ten university school situated on the campus of Guru Gobind Singh Indraprastha University. The campus covers an area of 60 acres.

Alumni
Md Nafees Ahmad MBA(W) 2019-21

See also
Guru Gobind Singh Indraprastha University
Case method
Business School

References

Sources
Information Booklet and Website of University School of Management Studies

External links
 USMS web site 1
 GGSIPU web site
 USMS web site 2
 USMS Alumni Blog
 USMS Photography Club

All India Council for Technical Education
Constituent schools of Guru Gobind Singh Indraprastha University
Educational institutions established in 1999
Business schools in Delhi
1999 establishments in Delhi